Peter Mociulski von Remenyk (September 3, 1945 – April 16, 2016), known professionally as Peter Rock, was an Austrian-born Chilean rock and roll and nueva ola musician. He sang in Festival de Viña del Mar and in Bierfest Valdivia.

He was born near Vienna in 1945, shortly after the death of his father. His mother remarried and the family emigrated to Chile in 1955.

Peter Rock's son, Justin Leigh, resides in Los Angeles and his daughter Natalie lived with him in Santiago, Chile. Peter Rock is Alain Johannes' uncle.

In October 2014, he was diagnosed with ALS, which kept him in a wheelchair. He died on Viña del Mar on April 16, 2016.

References

External links 
La Cuarta - La inmortal Nueva Ola
MúsicaPopular.cl Peter Rock

1945 births
2016 deaths
Austrian emigrants to Chile
Chilean male guitarists
20th-century Chilean male singers
Chilean rock singers
Chilean singer-songwriters
Chilean people of Austrian descent
Musicians from Vienna
Neurological disease deaths in Chile
Deaths from motor neuron disease
Naturalized citizens of Chile
20th-century Chilean male artists